Ulf Erik Jörgen Sundqvist (born September 24, 1982) is a Swedish professional ice hockey defenceman. He currently plays for Brynäs IF of the Swedish Hockey League (SHL).

Sundqvist has played with Brynäs IF since 2005 and, in March 2014, he signed an extension to keep him with the club until 2018.

Awards and honors

References

External links

1982 births
Living people
IFK Arboga IK players
Brynäs IF players
Leksands IF players
People from Härnösand
Skellefteå AIK players
Swedish ice hockey defencemen
Sportspeople from Västernorrland County